Duncton to Bignor Escarpment is a  biological Site of Special Scientific Interest west of Pulborough in West Sussex. It is a Special Area of Conservation and Bignor Hill is a Nature Conservation Review site, Grade I.

Ecosystem 
This steeply sloping site on the South Downs has mature beech woodland together with other habitats including chalk grassland and scrub. Invertebrates include the largest British population of the snail Helicodonta obvoluta and several rare moth species. A spring has a rich marginal vegetation including opposite-leaved golden saxifrage.

References

Sites of Special Scientific Interest in West Sussex